Taar or TAAR may refer to:

Taar (instrument) or tar, a Persian long-necked, waisted stringed instrument shared by many cultures and countries in central Asia and near the Caucasus region
Trace amine-associated receptor, a class of mammalian neurochemical receptors that are activated by trace amines
The All-American Rejects, a musical band.